VP8 is a video compression format owned by Google and created by On2 Technologies.

VP8 may also refer to:

 VP8 Image Analyzer, an analog computer made in 1972
 VP-8, Patrol Squadron Eight, a U.S. Navy land-based patrol squadron
 VP8, a viral protein; for example VP8* in Rotavirus